Peter Dascoulias (born April 17, 1949) is an American biathlete. He competed in the 20 km individual event at the 1976 Winter Olympics.

References

1949 births
Living people
American male biathletes
Olympic biathletes of the United States
Biathletes at the 1976 Winter Olympics
People from Franklin, New Hampshire